William Millar may refer to:
 William Millar (transportation executive), former President of the American Public Transportation Association
 William Millar (British Army officer) (died 1838), British Royal Artillery officer
 William Millar (politician) (1839–1913), Irish-born Wisconsin politician
 Billy Millar (rugby union) (1883–1949), South African rugby union player
 Willie Millar (1901–1966), Scottish footballer (Ayr United, Middlesbrough FC, York City)
 Billy Millar (footballer, born 1906), Irish international footballer (Linfield FC, Liverpool FC, Barrow AFC)
 Billy Millar (footballer, born 1924) (1924–1995), Scottish footballer (Aberdeen FC, Swindon Town, Gillingham FC, Accrington Stanley)
 William Millar (1931–1977), Irish-born American actor, known as Stephen Boyd
 Will Millar (born 1940), Irish-Canadian singer

See also
 William Miller (disambiguation)